The Gathering is a five-disc, career-spanning compilation album by British melodic rock band Magnum, released in 2010 by Sanctuary Records. It features previously unreleased live recordings, rare demos, b-sides and a live recording from Hammersmith Odeon, from 1988's Wings of Heaven tour.

"It wasn't enormous", said guitarist Tony Clarkin of his involvement. "I wanted a few tracks taken off, and I came up with the title… It turned out to be a really nice package."

Track listing

Personnel
Tony Clarkin – Guitar
Bob Catley – Vocals
Wally Lowe – Bass
Richard Bailey – Keyboards, Flute
Kex Gorin – Drums
Mark Stanway – Keyboards
Robin George – Guitar
Mickey Barker – Drums
Jim Simpson – Drums
Harry James – Drums
Al Barrow – Bass
Jimmy Copley – Drums

References

External links
 www.magnumonline.co.uk – Official Magnum site

Magnum (band) compilation albums
2010 compilation albums
Sanctuary Records compilation albums